John Neil Seward Jr. (October 11, 1924 – November 10, 2010) was a World War II veteran who was assigned to military intelligence in 1941 because of his knowledge of Japanese at a time when very few Americans knew the language. Following the war, Seward continued his intelligence work in Japan, during Allied occupation. After his time in the military and, later on, in the CIA, he worked with a number of companies and became a prolific writer. Some of his 45 books, in Japanese and English, are still used today. He was awarded the Order of the Sacred Treasure in 1986 for his efforts to spread knowledge of Japanese culture and language.

Honors and tributes
Order of the Sacred Treasure, 1986

References

External links
 Amazon listing of his books

1924 births
2010 deaths
People from Houston
20th-century American male writers
20th-century American translators
20th-century male writers
United States Army personnel of World War II
American expatriates in Japan
Recipients of the Order of the Sacred Treasure